Baçlabič (Václav) (died 936) - prince of Hevelli. Father of Tugumir and unknown concubine of Otton I the Great. Brother of  Drahomíra of Stodor

References

Polabian Slavs
936 deaths
Year of birth unknown